John Dillermand ("John Penisman", "John Willieman" or "John Dongman") is a Danish stop motion animated children's television series about a man and his very long penis. It premiered on 3 January 2021 on DR Ramasjang.

Premise 
John Dillermand is a middle-aged man who wears a red-and-white striped bathing costume. He has a penis that can extend to a length of dozens of meters. John uses his prehensile penis (which stretches through his clothes) as a tool, such as to tame lions or to fly about like a helicopter. But it also often acts independently of John, getting him into trouble.

Development and broadcast 
The series is aimed at four- to eight-year-olds and was developed by the Danish public broadcaster DR, in association with the sex education association Sex & Samfund. It premiered on 3 January 2021 on DR's children's channel DR Ramasjang. The first season, consisting of 13 five-minute episodes, was made available on the internet on 2 January 2021.

Reception 
John Dillermand was popular in Denmark upon release, with 250,000 children viewing the first episode in five days, and went viral. The series has found fans among Danish TV personalities and children; according to a DR executive, children were making snowmen, drawings, dolls and songs about John Dillermand. At the 2021 Fastelavn festivities, John Dillermand was a popular choice of costume.

Catherine Bennett of The Guardian praised the series as something that British leaders could learn from. But the series' unusual premise was also criticized as pandering to pedophiles, or as making light of the #MeToo movement against sexual violence against women. A gender studies professor of Roskilde University, Christian Groes, criticized the series for "perpetuating the standard idea of a patriarchal society and normalising ‘locker room culture’" which has been used to "excuse a lot of bad behaviour from men."

The DR executive said that the series was part of DR's ambition to make "children's content that dares to tackle embarrassing, difficult, quirky and funny topics", that it was about being true to oneself and one's flaws, and that it acknowledged children's curiosity about human bodies. He said that the series was "as desexualized as it can possibly get", and that it was developed together with a child psychologist and other professionals who reviewed the scripts to ensure that children would not misinterpret what they saw.

References

External links 
John Dillermand episodes on DR

2020s children's television series
2021 Danish television series debuts
Animation controversies in television
Danish children's animated comedy television series
Human penis
Obscenity controversies in animation
Obscenity controversies in television
Television controversies in Denmark
Sex education